Primitivo Lázaro Martínez (1909 – 10 May 1997) was a Spanish pianist and composer.

Lázaro was born in Fuentemolinos, Burgos, in 1909. Blind from three years of age, he entered at Santa Catalina in Madrid and after a few years was admitted Royal Conservatory of Madrid under the guide of Zacarias Lopez Debesa. 
 
He gave concerts in the main Spanish cities. Lázaro was also a brilliant arranger, composer, lecturer and conductor. From 1936 to 1938 he resided in the city of Salamanca, where he formed his own orchestra. In 1939 Lázaro was named Provincial Delegate of the ONCE in Huelva, where he spent the rest of his life. He died in Huelva on 10 May 1997.

1909 births
1997 deaths
20th-century classical composers
Blind classical musicians
Spanish blind people
Spanish classical pianists
Male classical pianists
Spanish classical composers
Spanish male classical composers
20th-century classical pianists
20th-century Spanish musicians
20th-century Spanish male musicians